City of Norwood v. Horney, 110 Ohio St.3d 353 (2006), was a case brought before the Ohio Supreme Court in 2006. The case came upon the heels of Kelo v. City of New London, in which the United States Supreme Court ruled that commercial development justified the use of eminent domain.  Kelo had involved the United States Constitution, while the issue in Norwood was the specific limitations of the Ohio State Constitution.

In the Norwood case, the city wished to seize about seventy homes and businesses to make way for private development, including retail, offices, and condominiums. Homeowners Joe Horney, Carl and Joy Gamble, and Matthew and Sanae Burton, filed three separate cases to stop the seizure of their homes.  Following appeals, these cases were combined into the Supreme Court case Norwood v. Horney.

In July 2006, the court found unanimously for the homeowners.  Justice Maureen O'Connor (later Chief Justice) wrote the majority opinion, which ruled that economic benefit alone was insufficient to satisfy the eminent domain statute of the Ohio Constitution; that an Ohio statute allowing for the use of eminent domain seizures in the case of "deteriorating areas" was void for vagueness; and that the rest of this statute should remain in force.  It also specified for the Ohio courts a standard for reviewing statutes that regulate eminent domain powers.

Original cases 
Norwood v. Horney
Gamble v. Norwood
Norwood v. Burton

References

External links

Norwood, Ohio
United States land use case law
Ohio state case law
2006 in United States case law
2006 in Ohio